The Transgender Persons (Protection of Rights) Act, 2018 is law in Pakistan which was enacted by the parliament in 2018 to legally provide equality to transgender people and to safeguard their rights. The law aims to legally recognise transgender people in the country. It also allows them to legally have the same rights as cisgender people.

In March 2020, the International Court of Justice (ICJ) addressed the provision of Pakistan after releasing a paper at International Transgender Day of Visibility. The ICJ highlighted features of the provision. Pakistan, according to the Aljazeera, is the one of the first nations that legally recognised transgender people.

Objectives 
 Transgender people may obtain a driving licence and passport
Transgender people may change their gender in the National Database & Registration Authority (NADRA) records on their own discretion
Harassing a transgender person at home or in a public place is prohibited
Discrimination of transgender people either educationally or socially is prohibited
Allows government to establishment safe houses, and to provide medical and educational facilities to transgender people. It also allows government to establish centers to provide them psychotherapy
Allows government to establish separate rooms for transgender people at jails
A person may be punished with a 6 years jail and PKR50,000 penalty for forcibly employing a transgender person for panhandling purpose.

Transgender violence 
Trans bashing in Pakistan refers to the violence and incidents which takes place in the country against transgender people. Transgender rights are legally protected by the law of Pakistan which prohibits discrimination and violence against trans people in the country. In Pakistan, 68 transgender people have been killed since 2015, and 1,500 were sexually assaulted in multiple incidents. In 2018, transgender people reportedly experienced 479 violence incidents in Khyber Pakhtunkhwa.

In September 2020, a prominent transgender activist Gul Panra, was shot six times. Nayyab Ali was allegedly sexually assaulted and attacked by acid claimed for being a transgender.

In 2019, Amnesty International published a report indicated Shama, a transgender journalist, was raped by nine men in one of Pakistan's cities, Peshawar.

Transgender population 
The total population of transgender people in 1998 was 10,418. In 2015, the Health ministry indicated that the number of transgender people in the country is nearly 150,000.

Effectiveness of the Law 
The Trans Protection Act is not the first time such government provisions to protect the rights of Trans people were taken, as the Supreme Court of Pakistan declared that trans peoples were equal to normal Pakistani citizens in 2010. This declaration of equality should have entitled trans peoples to equal job opportunities, education, and exempted them from discrimination. However, none of these things actually happened since the declaration, as in the last census roughly 40% of transgender peoples reported being illiterate, and the largest sources of income for trans peoples in Pakistan are dancing and sex work.  Due to the lack of penal nature for the Trans Protection Act, it has only served the same function that the aforementioned Supreme Court declaration did, and has only offered trans people formal equality and not substantive equality. The only penalty mentioned throughout the entire law is against gurus who incentivize their chenas to beg. The lack of penalties give the law no teeth, and there is no genuine incentive for the citizens to follow the law, and no infrastructure or concrete punishments in place to enforce it. This is present especially on the topic of education, as the law states that if a trans person meets the admission requirements for a school then their gender cannot be a deciding factor on their admittance to that school. This addresses the actual admittance processes that correlate with getting into a school, the law does not address the social stigmas and customs that make it extremely difficult for a trans person to meet these acceptance goals in the first place. The law also does not address many pressing issues to the trans community which include hate crimes against trans people, and proper healthcare for trans people.

Opposition
In 2022, transgender rights law debated again after four years in Senate Standing Committee on Human Rights. Senator Mushtaq Ahmed Khan of Jamaat-e-Islami, the initiator of the amendment bill, believes that the establishment of a medical board is necessary to determine the gender of transgender people.

References 

Acts of the Parliament of Pakistan
2018 establishments in Pakistan
 
Violence against LGBT people in Asia
Violence against trans women
Discrimination against transgender people
Sexism in Pakistan
Transgender law
LGBT law in Pakistan
2018 in LGBT history